{{DISPLAYTITLE:Iota1 Muscae}}

ι1 Muscae, Latinised as Iota1 Muscae, is a solitary star in the southern constellation of Musca, near the southern constellation border with Chamaeleon. It is visible to the naked eye as a dim, orange-hued star with an apparent visual magnitude is 5.05. The star is located around 222 light-years distant from the Sun based on parallax, and is drifting further away with a radial velocity of 27.5 km/s.

This object is an aging giant star with a stellar classification of K0III; a star that has used up its core hydrogen and is cooling and expanding. At present it has nearly 12 times the girth of the Sun.

References

K-type giants
Musca (constellation)
Muscae, Iota1
Durchmusterung objects
116244
065468
5042